Solid is the eleventh studio album recorded by American vocal duo Ashford & Simpson, released in 1984 on the Capitol label. The album features the song "Solid", which became the songwriting duo's biggest hit as performers.

Commercial performance
The album peaked at No. 1 on the US R&B albums chart. It also reached No. 29 on the Billboard 200. The album's title track peaked at No. 1 on the Hot Black Singles chart, No. 12 on the Billboard Hot 100 and No. 3 in the UK Singles Chart. Also featured are two other chart singles: "Outta the World" and "Babies".

Track listing

Personnel
Nickolas Ashford and Valerie Simpson – vocals
Sid McGinnis – guitar
Francisco Centeno – bass
Valerie Simpson – synthesizer, piano, bass
Ed Walsh, Joseph Joubert – synthesizer
James Newton Howard – keyboards, drum programming
Chris Parker, Brian Brake – drums
Jimmy Simpson, Sammy Figueroa, Ralph MacDonald – percussion
Tim Cox – Linn LM-1, recording engineer
Vinny Della Rocca, Michael Brecker – saxophone
Joe Mosello – trumpet
Sephra Herman - strings
Ashford & Simpson, Ray Simpson, Ullanda McCullough, Vivian Cherry – backing vocals

Charts

Singles

See also
List of number-one R&B albums of 1985 (U.S.)

References

External links
 

1984 albums
Ashford & Simpson albums
Albums produced by Ashford & Simpson
Capitol Records albums